Cuhtahlatah (Cherokee: Gatûñ'lätï ) was a Cherokee woman who lived during the period of the American Revolutionary War. Her name means "wild hemp". When her husband was killed in battle, she grabbed his tomahawk and attacked the enemy, screaming "Kill! Kill!". Her people had been in retreat, but her actions inspired them to rally and they gained victory in the battle.) Her story is recounted in the Wahnenauhi manuscript of 1889.

See also 
 Cherokee mythology

Further reading

References

Year of death missing
Cherokee Nation people (1794–1907)
Native American women in warfare
Women in 18th-century warfare
Year of birth unknown
18th-century Native American women